Il secondo tragico Fantozzi (The Second Tragic Fantozzi) is an Italian comedy film released in 1976. It is the second film in the saga of the unlucky clerk Ugo Fantozzi, played by its creator, Paolo Villaggio.

Plot
Fantozzi is working overtime to protect the "Clamorous Mega-Director Duke-Count Engineer" Semenzara, (a CEO) who is cheating on his wife. Missing security guards shooting (that mistake him as a rogue), he's even "physically" forced by his colleagues to return to work in normal daylight hours.

Casino 
CEO Semenzara is a very superstitious gambler and poker player. Fantozzi is chosen to accompany him to Monte Carlo, where he is forced to touch his bum, be stomped on, and drink gallons of water just for superstitious reasons. Unfortunately for Fantozzi, the Duke-Count loses all his money, blaming Fantozzi and forcing to him return home clinging for dear life under a train. Fantozzi comes back home totally immobilized, and is "cured" by Mrs. Pina with scalding cloths at a terrible temperature, causing him "mystic hallucinations" of St. Michael announcing his imminent pregnancy.

Hunting Party 
Filini and Fantozzi enjoys some hunting time; unfortunately the space reserved for hunters is very tiny: with extreme competition and an almost total absence of games, manhunt skirmishes quickly begin escalating to heavy machine guns and tanks. Fantozzi and Filini fall "just" as captured safari prey.

Launching ship 
Philanthropic Countess Serbelloni Mazzanti Viendalmare is selected to launch a new and massive cruise ship, but always misses targets when throwing bottles of champagne, hitting  Fantozzi twice times, the Mayor, a government minister, and a centenarian baroness. Then it is decided to cut a wire as a substitution, but she misses and cuts the archbishop's pinkie toe with a hatchet, resulting in the man cursing and chasing her, swearing to kill her. That same evening, noble lords organize a dinner with politicians, workers and clerks: including Fantozzi and Filini, being in the clutches of the giant, ferocious watchdog "Ivan the Terrible" XXXII. At dinner the two accountants, without social skills of any sort, botch almost everything, embarrassing their director: cruel jokes with a German ambassador, troubles with baked mockingbird and burning tomatoes. Eventually threatened again by Ivan the Terrible, Fantozzi suddenly flees in a fast Maserati, but the dog chases and confines him in the car for one week (counted by his CEO's as holidays).

American circus 
In reaction to already "spending" his holidays, Fantozzi pretends to be sick and goes to see the circus with free tickets. Unfortunately, he stumbles into his director, who recognizes him immediately. Hiding in a cannon, Fantozzi is fired and blown up in Sicily where, again under "mystical hallucinations", is informed by archangel Gabriel of his 9-months pregnancy.

Cineforum 

The powerful Professor Riccardelli is a CEO that 20 years ago hired Fantozzi (asking anomalous questions about silent films) as a "sponge for stamps" assignment. As an avant-garde cinema enthusiast, he periodically forces his underlings to watch boring and long foreign silent films such as Day of Wrath, Man of Aran, and Battleship Potemkin, mobbing a bored Fantozzi in debate sessions after screenings while his servile and hypocritical colleagues fake enjoy the films. One of this screenings forces Megacompany clerks to miss the real-time broadcast of an important world championship soccer match. In after-movie debate, Fantozzi rides disgruntled employees, openly denouncing the movie as "a crazy crap" (which results in a 92 minutes-long standing ovations, "a new world record") and takes CEO Riccardelli hostage, watching B movies and destroying reels of his beloved films. Eventually the police sedate the rebellion and the clerks are forced to reenact key scenes of Battleship Potemkin every Saturday as punishment.

Night Club 
Unexpectedly home alone, Fantozzi calls Calboni and Filini and organizes an evening with prostitutes. They finally spend the night in a hot club, buying everything that is possible; they go so far that the accountants will be so salty (over 3000 £, $3200) later, and can not find the money to even pay for the taxi drivers, lynching Filini. As the only one with a girl, Calboni betrays his wife.

Honeymoon 
It's the opportunity Fantozzi awaited so long and this time he finally succeeds. The two lovers land on Capri for a honeymoon, but it is studded with tragic situations (a crash on a giant stack, dives into an empty pool and by altitudes) and misunderstandings that result in reconciliation of Silvani and Calboni; a struggling Fantozzi, attempting suicide, is caught by a fishing boat and sold as a "sea product". Then he is bought by his wife Pina, returning home safe and sound and just in time to celebrate Christmas. Fantozzi is positive, and in an evening call by Galactic Mega-Director is offered back his old job, from which he was fired from before the honeymoon. The unfortunate accountant resumes work in his company, but this time as a lightning rod.

See also 

 List of Italian films of 1976

References

External links 

Italian comedy films
1976 comedy films
1976 films
1970s Italian-language films
Films directed by Luciano Salce
Films set in Rome
Films shot in Rome
Films scored by Fabio Frizzi
Italian sequel films
1970s Italian films